The Bologna Outdoor is a defunct Grand Prix and ATP affiliated men's tennis tournament played from 1985 to 1998. It was held in Bologna in Italy and held on outdoor clay courts.

Results

Singles

Doubles

See also
 Bologna Indoor

External links
 ATP Results Archive

 
Clay court tennis tournaments
Defunct tennis tournaments in Italy
Grand Prix tennis circuit
ATP Tour